Stephen James Brackenridge (born 31 July 1984) is an English professional footballer who plays as a right midfielder for New Mills. He played for Macclesfield Town in the Football League.

References

External links

1984 births
Living people
Footballers from Rochdale
English footballers
Association football midfielders
Macclesfield Town F.C. players
Hyde United F.C. players
Salford City F.C. players
Mossley A.F.C. players
New Mills A.F.C. players
English Football League players